General Federation of Trade Unions is the name of several union federations:

General Federation of Trade Unions (Iraq)
General Federation of Trade Unions of Korea
General Federation of Trade Unions (UK)
Palestine General Federation of Trade Unions
General Federation of Trade Unions (Syria)